Gail Stine (nee Caldwell, 1940–December 28, 1977) was an American philosopher who specialized in epistemology and philosophy of language. She was born in Schenectady, New York.

Before her death at the age of 37, she was a professor of philosophy at Wayne State University. Wayne State now holds the annual Gail Stine Memorial Lecture in her honor.

Education
Stine graduated from Mount Holyoke College in 1962. Stine was a student of W. V. O. Quine and received her PhD at Harvard University in 1969 under the supervision of Burton Dreben.

Work
Stine was an advocate of contextualism, the view that our standards for knowledge vary by situation. Stine also advocates the view that for a subject to know that p, she must rule out all relevant alternatives to p, a position also held by Alvin Goldman and Fred Dretske. Probably her most well-known article is her 1976 Philosophical Studies article, "Skepticism, Relevant Alternatives, and Deductive Closure".

References

1940 births
1977 deaths
Wayne State University faculty
Harvard University alumni
20th-century American philosophers
American women philosophers
Epistemologists
Philosophers of language
Mount Holyoke College alumni
20th-century American women